Umesh Nandkumar Patel (born 26 November 1983) is an Indian politician, from Chhattisgarh. He is a member of the Indian National Congress and has been the president of the Chhattisgarh Youth Congress Committee since 10 September 2016. He represents the Kharsia constituency in the Chhattisgarh Legislative Assembly.

He is minister of Higher Education of Chhattisgarh and Skill development, Science and Techonogy, Sports and Youth Development.

Early life  
Patel was born to politician Nand Kumar Patel and Smt. Neela Nandkumar Patel on 26 November 1902 in a politicians family who lived in Nandeli, a village in Raigarh district of Madhya Pradesh (present-day Chhattisgarh). His father late. Nand Kumar Patel was a political leader in Kharsia Constituency. He graduated in Information Technology and became an engineer.

Due to sudden demise of his father and elder brother, he had to leave his educational interests and join politics. In the year 2013, he was appointed as the Member of Legislative Assembly in Kharsia Constituency of Chhattisgarh. He also became the first youth leader of Indian National Congress from chhattisgarh and is maintaining his position after defeating O.P Choudhary (ex IAS Officer) from Bhartiya Janta Party, Kharsia.

Educational background 
Patel completed his schooling from Government Primary School, Nandeli, Raigarh, Madhya Pradesh (present-day Chhattisgarh). He pursued his higher secondary from Bhopal, Madhya Pradesh. He completed his graduation in the year 2005 from B.I.T Durg. He had also worked as an IT Professional in Capgemini Hyderabad & HSBC America during the years 2006–2013.

References 

1983 births
Living people
Chhattisgarh MLAs 2013–2018
Indian National Congress politicians from Chhattisgarh